Disko Island is a large island in Baffin Bay, off the west coast of Greenland.

Etymology
The name  means The Large Island (from  = island).

Geography

The port of Qeqertarsuaq (named after the island, and also known as Godhavn) lies on its southern coast. Blæsedalen valley is north of Qeqertarsuaq.

The island is separated from Nuussuaq Peninsula in the northeast by the Sullorsuaq Strait. To the south of the island lies Disko Bay, an inlet bay of Baffin Bay.

History
Erik the Red paid the first recorded visit to Disko Island at some time between 982 and 985; the island was used as a base for summer hunting and fishing by Norse colonists.

Geology

Mineral deposits, fossil finds and geological formations add to interest in the area. One of the interesting geological features is the native iron found at the island. A 22-ton (44,000 lbs; 20 tonnes) lump mixture of iron and iron carbide (cohenite) has been found. There are only a few places on earth where native iron is found which is not of meteoric origin.

There are numerous hot springs on the island. The microscopic animal Limnognathia, the only known member of its phylum, was discovered in the Isunngua spring.

Biodiversity

Several studies on the meiofauna show high marine interstitial diversity in Disko Island. For instance, the gastrotrich species Diuronotus aspetos is found in Iterdla and Kigdlugssaitsut and is so far reported only in Disko Island. It is associated with a rich diversity of other gastrotrichs like Chaetonotus atrox, Halichaetonotus sp., Mesodasys sp., Paradasys sp., Tetranchyroderma sp., Thaumastoderma sp. and Turbanella sp.

References

 
Islands of Baffin Bay
Disko Bay
Islands of Greenland